Leonardo Salinas Saldaña (born 8 April 1980 in Monterrey, Nuevo León) is a Mexican swimmer who competed in the 2004 Summer Olympics.

References

1980 births
Living people
Mexican male swimmers
Sportspeople from Monterrey
Mexican male freestyle swimmers
Olympic swimmers of Mexico
Swimmers at the 2004 Summer Olympics
Central American and Caribbean Games gold medalists for Mexico
Competitors at the 2002 Central American and Caribbean Games
Central American and Caribbean Games medalists in swimming
20th-century Mexican people
21st-century Mexican people